The 1979 Pontins Professional was the sixth edition of the professional invitational snooker tournament which took place between 5 and 12 May 1979 in Prestatyn, Wales.

The tournament featured eight professional players. Four players advance to the semi-final while the other four were eliminated in the group stage. All frames were played during the group stage matches.

Doug Mountjoy won the event, beating Graham Miles 8–4 in the final.


Group stage

  Fred Davis 4–3 Ian Anderson 
  Steve Davis 4–3 Ian Anderson 
  Steve Davis 5–2 Fred Davis 
  Steve Davis 6–1 Ray Reardon 
  Graham Miles 4–3 Doug Mountjoy 
  Graham Miles 5–2 Perrie Mans 
  Doug Mountjoy 5–2 John Spencer 
  Doug Mountjoy 6–1 Perrie Mans 
  Ray Reardon 5–2 Fred Davis 
  Ray Reardon 6–1 Ian Anderson 
  John Spencer 4–3 Graham Miles 
  John Spencer 5–2 Perrie Mans

Knockout stage

References

Pontins Professional
Snooker competitions in Wales
Pontins Professional
Pontins Professional
Pontins Professional